Rezső Xavier Ferencz Lipot Sándor Crettier (15 November 1878 in Budapest – 1945) was a Hungarian track and field athlete who competed at the 1900 Summer Olympics. He participated in the discus throw competition and finished fifth and in the shot put competition where he finished fourth.

References

External links

profile 
Rezső Crettier's profile at Sports Reference.com

1878 births
1945 deaths
Athletes from Budapest
Hungarian male discus throwers
Hungarian male shot putters
Athletes (track and field) at the 1900 Summer Olympics
Olympic athletes of Hungary
Date of death missing
Place of death missing
Sportspeople from the Austro-Hungarian Empire